McMinnville Downtown Historic District in McMinnville, Oregon, United States is a historic district that was listed on the National Register of Historic Places (NRHP) in 1987.

According to the Oregon State Historic Preservation Office, "There are a total of 66 buildings in the district. However, 521-525 E 3rd is listed as only one building rather than two as in the nomination, lowering the total listing to 65. 611 N 3rd and 425 N Evans are counted and listed separately but have been combined into one building. The following addresses are shared by 2 buildings: 448 E 3rd St, 216 E 3rd St."

References

External links

Image of McMinnville Downtown Historic District on Flickr from the National Park Service
City of McMinnville Planning Department Historic Preservation

National Register of Historic Places in Yamhill County, Oregon
Historic districts on the National Register of Historic Places in Oregon
Geography of Yamhill County, Oregon
McMinnville, Oregon
1989 establishments in Oregon